Charles Ignace Adélard Gill (21 October 1871 – 16 October 1918) was a Canadian artist, specializing in poetry and painting. He also worked under the alternate names of Clairon and Léon Duval.

Career
He was born at Sorel, Quebec to Charles-Ignace Gill and Marie-Rosalie Delphire Sénécal. He studied at Collège Sainte-Marie de Montréal, Collège de Nicolet and Collège Saint-Laurent, then George de Forest Brush, who was vacationing in Pierreville, undertook to develop Gill's talent for painting. As a result, he went to the Art Association of Montreal that 1888 to study with William Brymner. Encouraged by Brymner, he went to Paris and worked with Jean-Léon Gérôme at the École des Beaux-Arts. After returning to Montreal, he established his own studio in 1894.

He also published poetry in the anthology Les soirées du Château de Ramesay (1900). After his death a volume of his poetry was published under the title Le Cap Eternité, poème suivi des étoiles filantes (1919).

Gill had one son, Roger-Charles, with his wife Georgine Bélanger (aka Gaëtane de Montreuil, m. 12 May 1902). He died at Montreal from the 1918 flu pandemic just short of his 47th birthday.

References

External links
 

1871 births
1918 deaths
Deaths from Spanish flu
20th-century Canadian poets
20th-century Canadian male writers
Canadian male poets
19th-century Canadian painters
Canadian male painters
20th-century Canadian painters
People from Sorel-Tracy
Canadian alumni of the École des Beaux-Arts
Canadian poets in French
Artists from Quebec
Writers from Quebec
19th-century Canadian male artists
20th-century Canadian male artists